Sefid Sang (also Romanized as Sefīd Sang; also known as Safed Sang, Safīd Sagak, Sang-i-Sefīd, and Sefīd Sagak) is a city in Qalandarabad District, in Fariman County, Razavi Khorasan Province, Iran. At the 2006 census, its population was 4,894, in 1,110 families.

There is also another safaid sang a village that is located in the outskirts of Peshawar city in Pakistan.

References 

Populated places in Fariman County
Cities in Razavi Khorasan Province